XHSH-FM is a radio station in Mexico City. Broadcasting on 95.3 FM, XHSH-FM carries contemporary music in Spanish from the 1990s until the present, with a focus on romantic songs under the name "Amor".

History
XHSH-FM's history begins with a concession awarded in 1964 to Narciso Solis Huerta, who eventually sold it to FM Radio, S.A. by 1968. The station was launched by FM Radio in 1970 as "Radio Amistad", carrying a contemporary music format in English and Spanish.

In 1986, the station became "Stereo Nova", simulcasting XEL-AM 1260 and carrying youth music in Spanish. It returned to its old name as "Stereo Amistad" in 1988, with English-language contemporary music, jazz and New Age. The name was kept when the station changed to Spanish-language pop and romance music in 1993, but the station became "Mix 95.3", with English contemporary music, a year later.

In 1995, Grupo ACIR, owner of FM Radio, S.A. de C.V., added 88.9, 99.3 and 106.5 FM to its stable; previously XHSH was its only Mexico City station. This resulted in the Panorama Informativo newscast moving to 88.9 and the Mix format to 106.5. XHSH then became "OK" with tropical music, then "La Comadre" with grupera, and from 1997 to 2002 contemporary music in Spanish as "Inolvidable". In 2002, it was renamed "Amor".

References

External links
iheart Mexico City website

Radio stations in Mexico City
Grupo ACIR